Pakistan Super League is a professional Twenty20 cricket league, which is operated by Pakistan Cricket Board. It is contested between six franchises comprising cricketers from Pakistan and around the world.

A century is regarded as a landmark score for a batsman, achieved when he scores 100 or more runs in a single innings. His number of centuries is generally recorded in his career statistics.

Key

Centuries

Season overview

Team overview

See also
List of Pakistan Super League cricketers
List of Pakistan Super League records and statistics

References

Centuries